The 4th Maryland Regiment was organized on 27 March 1777 as a part of eight companies from Baltimore, Anne Arundel and Somerset Counties. It was assigned to the 2nd Maryland Brigade—a part of the Main Army—on 22 May 1777. Assigned 27 December 1776 to the Main Army. Authorized 16 September 1776 in the Continental Army as the 4th Maryland Regiment. Reorganized 12 May 1779 to consist of nine companies. (2d Maryland Brigade relieved 5 April 1780 from the Main Army and assigned to the Southern Department.) Relieved 1 January 1781 from the Maryland Brigade. Assigned 24 September 1781 to Gist's Brigade of the Main Army. (Gist's Brigade relieved 27 October 1781 from the Main Army and assigned to the Southern Department.) Relieved 4 January 1782 from Gist's Brigade and assigned to the Maryland Brigade, an element of the Southern Department. Disbanded 1 January 1783 at Charleston, South Carolina.

References

Further reading

External links

Bibliography of the Continental Army in Maryland compiled by the United States Army Center of Military History

Maryland regiments of the Continental Army
1776 establishments in Maryland
1783 disestablishments in Maryland